Patrick J. Cunneen (born 1936) is an Irish retired hurler who played at club level with St. Patrick's and at inter-county level with Limerick.

Career

From the St. Patrick's club, Cunneen first came to prominence on the inter-county scene with the Limerick junior team that overcame London to win the 1955 All-Ireland Junior Championship. Promotion to the senior side followed, with Cunneen lining out in goal when Limerick surprised Clare to win the 1955 Munster Championship. The team, labelled "Mackey's Greyhounds" after their trainer Mick Mackey, were subsequently beaten by eventual champions Wexford in the All-Ireland semi-final.

Honours

Limerick
Munster Senior Hurling Championship: 1955
All-Ireland Junior Hurling Championship: 1954
Munster Junior Hurling Championship: 1954

References

1936 births
Living people
Hurling goalkeepers
Irish farmers
Limerick inter-county hurlers
St Patrick's (Limerick) hurlers